Dekaton or Decatum may refer to:
Dekaton (Bithynia), settlement in ancient Bithynia, now in Asiatic Turkey
Dekaton (Thrace), settlement in ancient Thrace, now in European Turkey